John Henry Hintermeister (1869-1945) was a Swiss-born American artist, a "well-known illustrator and a painter of American historical scenes," who created paintings for calendars and  advertising illustration for the American Art Works company, Brown & Bigelow, Church and Dwight, Louis F. Dow, Kemper-Thomas, the Osborne Co., and Thomas D. Murphy. He was the father of another illustrator, Henry Hintermeister. Both men used the signature Hy Hintermeister, causing confusion among collectors. The two worked together, producing more than 1050 illustrations.

Education and career
John Henry Hintermeister was born in Winterthur, Switzerland, and attended the University of Zurich. When his father August Friedrich Hintermeister immigrated to the United States, he remained in Switzerland to finish school, studying art. He turned down a professorship in Switzerland and a chance to teach, choosing instead to join his father in the United States in 1890. In the United States, he worked as a courtroom artist and as a commercial illustrator. After nearly dying in the Park Place Disaster in August 1891, in which the factory building he was working in collapsed, he stepped away from the in-factory lithography that he was doing at the time to "pursue his dreams."

He painted original art for the next 50 years, and had works given copyright in the 1946 registry. His subjects included "landscapes, people, humor, Native Americans, fishing and hunting scenes." His son joined him in the business by the early 1920s and the two worked together, producing artwork for calendars, safety posters, and advertising, with images including kids and dogs, the Boy Scouts of America, "Granny and Gramps" humor illustrations, fishing and hunting scenes.

He became one of the oldest members of the New York City Swiss Society and was "a member of the Salmagundi Club, the Brooklyn Society of Artists, and the Artists Professional League."

Gallery
John Henry Hintermeister signed his paintings "Hy Hintermeister", the same as his son, but he would sometimes add his first initial, signing "J. Hy. Hintermeister."

References 

20th-century American painters
American illustrators
1869 births
1945 deaths